Nickel–Strunz classification is a scheme for categorizing minerals based upon their chemical composition, introduced by German mineralogist Karl Hugo Strunz (24 February 1910 – 19 April 2006) in his Mineralogische Tabellen (1941). The 4th and the 5th edition was also edited by Christel Tennyson (1966). It was followed by A.S. Povarennykh with a modified classification (1966 in Russian, 1972 in English).

As curator of the Mineralogical Museum of Friedrich-Wilhelms-Universität (now known as the Humboldt University of Berlin), Strunz had been tasked with sorting the museum's geological collection according to crystal-chemical properties. His book Mineralogical Tables, has been through a number of modifications; the most recent edition, published in 2001, is the ninth (Mineralogical Tables by Hugo Strunz and Ernest H. Nickel (31 August 1925 – 18 July 2009)). James A. Ferraiolo was responsible for it at Mindat.org. The IMA/CNMNC supports the Nickel–Strunz database.

Nickel–Strunz code scheme
The Nickel–Strunz code scheme is NN.XY.##x, where:
 NN: Nickel–Strunz mineral class number
 X: Nickel–Strunz mineral division letter
 Y: Nickel–Strunz mineral family letter
 ##x: Nickel–Strunz mineral/group number; x an add-on letter

Nickel–Strunz mineral classes
The current scheme divides minerals into ten classes, which are further divided into divisions, families and groups according to chemical composition and crystal structure.

 elements
 sulfides and sulfosalts
 halides
 oxides, hydroxides and arsenites
 carbonates and nitrates
 borates
 sulfates, chromates, molybdates and tungstates
 phosphates, arsenates and vanadates
 silicates
 organic compounds

IMA/CNMNC mineral classes
IMA/CNMNC proposes a new hierarchical scheme , using the Nickel–Strunz classes (10 ed) this gives:

 Classification of minerals (non silicates)
 Nickel–Strunz class 01: Native Elements
 Class: native elements
 Nickel–Strunz class 02: Sulfides and Sulfosalts
 Class 02.A – 02.G: sulfides, selenides, tellurides (including arsenides, antimonides, bismuthinides)
 Class 02.H – 02.M: sulfosalts (including sulfarsenites, sulfantimonites, sulfobismuthites, etc.)
 Nickel–Strunz class 03: Halogenides
 Class: halides
 Nickel–Strunz class 04: Oxides
 Class: oxides
 Class: hydroxides
 Class: arsenites (including antimonites, bismuthites, sulfites, selenites and tellurites)
 Nickel–Strunz class 05: Carbonates and Nitrates
 Class: carbonates
 Class: nitrates
 Nickel–Strunz class 06: Borates
 Class: borates
 Subclass: nesoborates
 Subclass: soroborates
 Subclass: cycloborates
 Subclass: inoborates
 Subclass: phylloborates
 Subclass: tectoborates
 Nickel–Strunz class 07: Sulfates, Selenates, Tellurates
 Class: sulfates, selenates, tellurates
 Class: chromates
 Class: molybdate, wolframates and niobates
 Nickel–Strunz class 08: Phosphates, Arsenates, Vanadates
 Class: phosphates
 Class: arsenates and vanadates
 Nickel–Strunz class 10: Organic Compounds
 Class: organic compounds
 Classification of minerals (silicates)
 Nickel–Strunz class 09: Silicates and Germanates
 Class: silicates
 Subclass: nesosilicates
 Subclass: sorosilicates
 Subclass: cyclosilicates
 Subclass: inosilicates
 Subclass: phyllosilicates
 Subclass: tectosilicates without zeolitic H2O
 Subclass: tectosilicates with zeolitic H2O; zeolite family
 Subclass: unclassified silicates
 Subclass: germanates

See also 
 Classification of minerals – Non silicates
 Classification of minerals – Silicates
 Hey's Mineral Index
 Timeline of the discovery and classification of minerals

Notes

References

External links

Strunz classification on Mindat

Mineralogy
Scientific classification